Amit Mishra is an Indian singer, songwriter, voice actor and live performer. He became more well known after the release of the song "Bulleya" sung by him from the film "Ae Dil Hai Mushkil" ; for his rendition of the song he won a Filmfare Award for new music talent, Screen Award for Best Male Playback and IIFA Award for Best Male Playback. He got nominated for the same song in different award shows. He has also sung in some of Telugu, Bengali and Marathi films.

Early life
Amit Mishra's father Devendra Prasad Mishra is a businessman and mother Geeta Mishra is a homemaker. Amit graduated in B.Com from Lucknow University and also learned music from Bhatkhande Music Institute located at Lucknow. Amit was also part of a band called TRISHNA in Lucknow. Along with his band, Amit got a chance to perform in "Idea Rocks India 2009" which was aired on Colours where Amit was the lead vocalist of the band. They were among the top 4 bands in that season.

Career
Amit Mishra is a trained musician and a classical vocalist. He became recognized as a solo artist after lending his vocals to the album "eternal love" by Parthiv Shah. Amit was also part of the MTV Unplugged Season 6.

Mishra's most popular songs include "Sau Tarah Ke" from Dishoom, "Manma Emotion Jaage" from Dilwale, "Bulleya" from Ae Dil Hai Mushkil, "Seedha Saadha" from Commando 2. He recorded a song for the film Tubelight called "Radio" along with Kamaal Khan.

As well as singing he plays a number of musical instruments. He can compose songs and has also worked as an arranger from soft instrumental to remixes. Mishra has worked nationwide and  lent his voice to movies, television advertisements and daily soap titles.

Amit recorded "Rabba Ve", the track for popular daily soap opera of Star Plus, Iss Pyaar Ko Kya Naam Doon 3.

Discography

Hindi

Bengali

Telugu

Tamil

Marathi

Album songs

Devotional songs

As a lyricist

Awards and nominations

As singer

References

1989 births
Living people
University of Lucknow alumni
Indian male singer-songwriters
Indian singer-songwriters
Indian male voice actors
Singers from Lucknow
Screen Awards winners
International Indian Film Academy Awards winners